ISRO spinoff technologies are commercial products and services which have been developed with the help of Indian Space Research Organisation, through research and development, licensing of ISRO patents, use of ISRO facilities, technical assistance from ISRO personnel, or data from ISRO research. So far 300 technologies have been transferred to Indian industries and licensee industries to manufacture and market the products. New Space India Limited was set up to market spin-off technologies and products and services both in India and abroad. Antrix Corporation was also established on September 1992 to commercialize space products.

Products 
Below are spinoff products developed by ISRO.

Adhesives
ISRO has developed various structural and non-structural adhesives. silicon based, polyurethane elastomers and acrylic based adhesives are Non-structural. Epoxy resins, phenol based and rubber based adhesives using chloroprene and neoprene are Structural. These adhesives can be used in automobile and other engineering industries.

Thermal barrier
Unnamed thermal barrier used in cryogenic fuel tanks made up of hydrophobic silica aerogel has low thermal conductivity, density and high specific surface area. It can be used as thermal insulator to manufacture winter clothes and boots of soldiers stationed in extremely cold regions.

Left ventricular assist device
Using lightweight rocket material, ISRO has developed a low-cost heart pump that assists the human heart, notably in cases of left ventricle failure. The device is composed of a special bio-compatible titanium alloy and can pump 3-5 litres of blood every minute. It has been experimented on animals and it was found to be successful.

Other
 Distress Alert Transmitter (DAT)
NavIC messaging receiver
MSS type-C reporting terminal for automated train tracking
TRISP power module
Endoscopic Catheter Mounted Impedance Probe to Assess Mucosal Health.
Capacitive Sensor to detect malignancy in Leukocytes
ISRO smart limb: low-cost bionic limb for amputees.
 Artificial Polyurethane Foot
 Fire Extinguishing Powders
 PARAS-3D (Parallel Aerodynamic Simulator) Software
 Search and Rescue Beacon
 IGiS: Indigenous Geographic and Image Processing Software package 
 Automatic Weather Station
 Silica Cloth (ISROSIL)
CASPOL: Fire retardant coating
 DTH Based Disaster Warning system (DWS)
 Sliprings
 Agrophotometer
 Pedclean
 Pressure Transducers
 Ultrasonic Liquid Level Sensor
 Fibre Optic Liquid Level Sensor
 Dual Polarization LIDAR- DPL
 Lower Atmospheric Wind Profiler-LAWP
 Precision Tapping Attachment
 Photosynthesis Irradiance incubation (PI) Box
 Ground Penetration Radars
 Digital Holographic Testing Machine
 Artificial Denture Material-ACRAMID
 Doppler Weather Radar (DWR)
 Phantom Connectivity
 QPad Mobile GIS-GPS Software
 Vibration Management Solution
 Elastomagnetic Abrasive Spheres for Fine Finishing

See also
 NASA spinoff technologies

References 

Indian Space Research Organisation
Corporate spin-offs